Giachomo "Jimmy-6" Fortunato is a fictional character appearing in American comic books published by Marvel Comics. The character is featured in the Marvel Universe and is commonly associated with Spider-Man. He first appeared in the comic, Spider-Man #70 and was created by writer Howard Mackie and artist John Romita Jr.

Fictional character biography
When the Kingpin (Wilson Fisk) lost control of New York's underworld, crime lord Don Fortunato filled the power void. His son, Giachomo "Jimmy-6" Fortunato, disapproved of his family's methods and tried to quit organized crime just as his father's plans were coming to fruition. Enraged, Don Fortunato demands his son's death. On the run, Jimmy-6 pushes Ben Reilly (a clone of Peter Parker) away from a barrage of bullets intended for him. As Spider-Man, Reilly returns the favor later by rescuing Jimmy-6 from an assassination attempt. Although the wounded Jimmy-6 wants nothing to do with Spider-Man, he reluctantly accepted Reilly's offer to hide out at his apartment.

Hoping that Jimmy-6 could still be persuaded to return, Don Fortunato orders that he be captured rather than killed. Shortly after meeting Reilly's "cousin" Peter Parker, Jimmy-6 learns of an alliance of rival crime lords formed by gangster Hammerhead which plans to assassinate Don Fortunato. Jimmy went to warn his father of the planned hit, only to learn that Don Fortunato has formed an alliance with the HYDRA terrorist organization to defeat his rivals.

In a small ceremony, Fortunato reveals he has kidnapped civilians from each of the territories of the attending crime lords. Jimmy-6 learns the civilians are to be executed as an example of what would happen in case of disobedience. Horrified, Jimmy pulls a gun on his own father. The attendees wait and see what happens. Don Fortunato disowns Jimmy right there on stage. Spider-Man - then Ben Reilly - and Daredevil help rescue the civilians but need help themselves when they are cornered near an exit. Jimmy-6 flies in on an attack helicopter, killing the men threatening the group and carrying the heroes and civilians away to safety.

Later, Jimmy-6 learns the Green Goblin (Norman Osborn) has killed Ben Reilly, and vows to avenge his friend's death.

Wounded by enemies of his father in Forest Hills, Queens, Jimmy-6 seeks refuge at the nearby Parker residence, where he stops an assassin sent by the Green Goblin. He then departs. When Spider-Man (Peter Parker) was suspected of murdering street thug Joey Z, Jimmy-6, feeling he owes Spider-Man his life, saves him from vigilantes trying to collect the $5 million bounty placed on Spider-Man's head. Soon after, Jimmy-6 shot a new Green Goblin (a genetic creation employed by Osborn), although the Goblin's armor saved him. Several vigilantes sought the bounty on Jimmy's head afterward, but the Punisher (Frank Castle) and government mercenary Shotgun (J.R. Walker) save him.

When the Kingpin returns to claim his criminal empire, Jimmy-6 challenges him and rejoins the Fortunato crime cartel, replacing his incapacitated father (allegedly hospitalized by Kingpin). Trying to stop the bloodshed, Jimmy-6 reaches an agreement with the Kingpin. Peter Parker is caught photographing a secret meeting between Jimmy and the Kingpin, but Jimmy lets Parker go due to his "relationship" to Ben Reilly. After one of Jimmy's men accidentally knocks over the Kingpin's high-stakes poker game, New York erupts in a gang war between rival underworld faction. When Jimmy and his family are caught in a crossfire involving Kingpin's Enforcers (Fancy Dan, Montana, & Ox), Spider-Man's intervention enables Jimmy to escape, and he later helps Jimmy defeat the Enforcers in Jimmy's penthouse.

Jimmy-6's current status is unknown now that Don Fortunato has regained his health and control of the cartel, but it was confirmed that Jimmy-6 had somehow made peace with his father, as Fortunato briefly refers to him as "My Beautiful Giacomo," showing no signs of ill will. With Angelo dead after as short term as the second Venom, Jimmy-6 is in all probability the sole heir to Fortunato's crime empire.

Powers and abilities
Composed almost entirely of muscle, Jimmy-6's massive frame grants him peak human strength and resists many penetration wounds. He is a skilled strategist and electrical engineer, having designed the Fortunato estate's security systems. A veteran of two tours of duty with the U.S. Army, he is an accomplished hand-to-hand combatant, firearms user, and helicopter pilot.

In other media
In the first iteration of Spider-Man: Turn Off the Dark, the show was narrated by the Geek Chorus, Spider-Man fans who were in the process of writing the most extreme and ultimate Spider-Man story ever. One of them claims the name Jimmy-6. The role was played by Gideon Glick.

References

External links
 Jimmy-6 at the Marvel Wiki

Characters created by John Romita Jr.
Characters created by Howard Mackie
Fictional gangsters
Marvel Comics male characters
Fictional Italian American people
Comics characters introduced in 1996
Spider-Man characters